Jugosloveni (trans. Yugoslavs) are a Serbian rock band, successful throughout all of former Yugoslavia and best known for their hit "Jugosloveni".

Band history

1986 - 1989
The band was formed in 1986 by the vocalist Zoran Paunović (a former Magično Oko member). Jugosloveni released their debut album Došlo mi je da se napijem (I Feel like Getting Drunk) in 1986, in the following lineup: Zoran Paunović (vocals), Nenad Maričić (guitar), Dragan Latinčić (bass guitar) and Goran Milanović (drums). The album also featured Kornelije Kovač on keyboards and Vlada Negovanović on guitar. The songs were classic rock-oriented while lyrics featured slang and were social-related. The album featured the band's biggest hit, "Jugosloveni". For the recording of the second Jugosloveni album the band's frontman Paunović fired the complete lineup. He recorded Vruće osvežavajuće (Hot Refreshment) with studio musicians: Vlada Negovanović (guitar), Dragoljub Đuričić (drums), Ted Jani (guitar), Zoran Radomirović (bass guitar) and Saša Lokner (keyboards). The third album, Krici i šaputanja (Screams and Whispers) was recorded in the new lineup, but once again in cooperation with studio musicians. After the album was released Jugosloveni officially disbanded.

2006 - present
In 2006, Zoran Paunović rerecorded the band's old songs in a pop folk manner, releasing them under Jugosloveni moniker on the album Igralište (Playground). However, the band did not officially reunite until 2013, when they released the album Tvoje ime je ljubav (Your Name Is Love). The new lineup featured, besides Paunović, Goran Vranić (guitar), Dejan Maksimović (drums) and Predrag Gostović (bass guitar).

Discography

Studio albums
Došlo mi je da se napijem (1986)
Vruće osvežavajuće (1987)
Krici i šaputanja (1988)
Igralište (2006)
Tvoje ime je ljubav (2013)

Compilations
Došlo mi je da se napijem (1997)

References 
Citations

Bibliography
EX YU ROCK enciklopedija 1960-2006, Janjatović Petar;

External links 
Jugosloveni at Discogs

 
 

Serbian rock music groups
Serbian pop rock music groups
Yugoslav rock music groups
Musical groups from Belgrade
Musical groups established in 1986
Musical groups disestablished in 1989
1986 establishments in Yugoslavia
1989 disestablishments in Yugoslavia